The Old Apostolic Lutheran Church of America (OALC) is a Firstborn Laestadian church in North America. Firstborn Laestadians are a subgroup within Laestadianism. The Old Apostolic Lutheran Church originated in the 1890s. In the Nordic Firstborn Laestadian revival, the movement works within the official Church of Sweden, which is also called the "Lutheran Folk Church". The Church of Sweden has for a long time recognized the Laestadian movement and has allowed them to hold their own services in the state churches, both before and after the separation of church and state. Even in America it still has a relationship with the Church of Sweden.

Doctrine
The OALC believes in the Trinity: the Father, the Son, and the Holy Spirit. It confesses the Holy Bible, consisting of the Old and New testaments, as the only unchangeable Word of God for salvation and the standard by which all doctrines of salvation should be examined. The OALC accepts the Apostles' Creed, the Nicene-Constantinopolitan Creed, the Unaltered Augsburg Confession, and the original doctrine of Martin Luther, Lars Levi Laestadius, and the elders of this church in Swedish Lapland in this era (known as the Church of Firstborn).

Membership
The Old Apostolic Lutheran Church is the largest Laestadian/Apostolic Lutheran church in America. At its beginning in about 1900, it was a small group when the Laestadian movement in America was splintered, giving rise to the "New Apostolic Lutheran Church" and the "Old Apostolic Lutheran Church." Originally, the OALC had only a few church buildings, and services were usually held in homes. During the twentieth and twenty-first centuries the OALC had grown due primarily to the belief in, and creation of, large families.

The Old Apostolic Lutheran Church of America is the nationwide ecclesiastical association, and has member congregations in the following states: Washington, Michigan, Minnesota, South Dakota, North Dakota, North Carolina, Delaware, Wyoming, Montana and Wisconsin. The most significant membership is in southwest area of the state of Washington. Other large congregations are located in Lake Norden, South Dakota ; Hancock, Michigan ; Minneapolis, Minnesota ; Duluth, Minnesota ; and Detroit, Michigan. The OALC also has congregations in Canada and in Alaska. In the Battle Ground area of Washington, churches now exist in Brush Prairie, Lewisville, Heisson,  Woodland, and Yacolt. A future church is being planned for Battle Ground. This large number of Old Apostolic Lutherans is concentrated in the central and northern sections of Clark County, Washington. In the Columbian's interview, Dale Schlecht, who is one of the preachers at the Brush Prairie church in Clark county, said there is no way to ascertain the exact number of members, because the church does not keep a roster of membership.

Old Apostolic Lutherans - as all Firstborn Laestadians - greet each other with the phrase; "God's peace!" This is a shorter form of the greeting "May God's peace be with you." This is believed to be the highest greeting that one OALC member can offer to another.

The Old Apostolic Lutheran Church of America is an independent church, but from the beginning it has had close ties to Scandinavian countries and Finland. It is a sister organization to the Firstborn Laestadians of Finland and Scandinavian countries. The global Firstborn Laestadian movement in America, Finland, Denmark, and Norway is under the care and supervision of the Elders of Swedish Lapland. The Firstborn Laestadian movement in Swedish Lapland is understood and accepted as the mother congregation to which all the American congregations look for guidance. Being under the supervision of the elders of Swedish Lapland keeps the church in both outward unity and spiritual unity.

Ministers and activities
The OALC is lay oriented and has a layman approach to the ministry, meaning the preachers are not paid by the church and the preachers do not have a theological education or ordination. However, they do have a procedure for training their preachers. New preachers are selected by the congregation and the existing preachers. Preachers are expected to work full-time to support their families while also maintaining their preachers' responsibilities to the congregation. Each local congregation has many preachers and no one preacher preaches every Sunday; rather they take turns preaching. Once a person is chosen as a preacher, they generally serve for the rest of their lives. Some preachers are put on missionary work and they are called as missionary men or missionary preachers. Missionary men travel on missions and hold meetings in United States and Canada. Communion services are held on the first Sunday of every month, which is designated as Communion Sunday. Sunday School is also held. In the OALC lay preachers function as pastors, they preach in services and administer baptism and communion. Preachers distribute communion, but if they don't have enough preachers, then male parishioners may help. Preachers also officiate at funeral services, but only those preachers who have licenses from the state conduct weddings.

The OALC was the first Laestadian church which had English-speaking preachers. This began in 1899. The prevalent language is English, although sermons have been translated from Finnish into English to some degree. They still read Laestadius' sermons in their services. OALC activities are traditional Laestadian. OALC traditionally holds special Christmas and midsummer services, as in Scandinavia. The Christmas services alternate among Minneapolis, Detroit, Newark, and Brush Prairie. In Alaska they also hold mission services.

Publications
The church does not publish its own periodical, but Rauhan Side (Bond of Peace) is read to some degree, although it is in Finnish and published in Finland with only with a short English summary of the main articles. Several books of Laestadius' sermons have been translated and published, as well as his book Ens Ropandes röst I öknen (The Voice of One Crying in the Wilderness). OALC preacher Henrik Koller (1859–1935) published his own periodical, Sion’s News, from 1891 to 1896. The OALC has published Luther's Small Catechism for younger children and Bible History for teenagers. It has published its own hymnal and altar book. The OALC has published The Fathers Voice vol. I-III (1969-1989), which are English translations of the Swedish periodical Fadersrösten, edited by Firstborn Laestadian preacher Sam Wettainen. The King James Version (KJV) is the Bible translation used in the OALC.

See also
Laestadianism in the United States

Sources
Amerikan Vanha Apostolis Luterilainen Seurakunta: Perustus ja Sivu Lait, 1947, Hancock, Michigan: Suom. Lut. Kustannusliikkeen Kirjapaino.
Old Apostolic Lutheran Church of America, History of Living Christianity in America, 1999, Minneapolis, Minnesota.
Carl A. Kulla, The Journey Of An Immigrant Awakening Movement In America: A Brief History Of Laestadianism and The Apostolic Lutheran Church, 2004, Brush Prairie, Washington.
Aila Foltz - Miriam Yliniemi, A Godly Heritage: Historical View of the Laestadian Revival and Development of the Apostolic Lutheran Church in America, 2005, Frazee, Minnesota.

References

External links
 

Laestadianism
Lutheran denominations in North America